Patriots Point Naval & Maritime Museum is located in Mount Pleasant, South Carolina, at the mouth of the Cooper River on the Charleston Harbor, across from Charleston.

Museum ships and exhibits

Patriots Point is home to two museum ships:
 , an aircraft carrier 
 , a destroyer

The submarine  was open until 2021 when she was closed due to her deteriorating condition. By 2022, she was being scrapped on site.

Yorktown has many exhibits on board, including:
 Medal of Honor museum, with biographies of all medal recipients
 28 naval aircraft, including:
 Douglas A-3 Skywarrior 
 Douglas A-4 Skyhawk
 Grumman A-6 Intruder
 Ling-Temco-Vought A-7 Corsair II
 McDonnell Douglas F-4 Phantom II
 Grumman F-9 Cougar
 Grumman F-14 Tomcat
 Lockheed S-3 Viking
 Boeing-Stearman Model 75
 Douglas SBD Dauntless
 Grumman F4F Wildcat
 Grumman TBM Avenger
 Vought F4U Corsair
 Grumman F6F Hellcat
 Douglas A-1 Skyraider
 Grumman F-9 Cougar
 North American B-25 Mitchell
 McDonnell Douglas F/A-18 Hornet
 Sikorsky SH-3 Sea King
 Grumman E-1 Tracer
 Vought F-8 Crusader
 Grumman S-2 Tracker

Exhibits ashore include: 
 Civil War-era cannon
 Vietnam War-era:
 US Navy Bell UH-1 Iroquois helicopter
 US Army Bell UH-1 Iroquois helicopter (MEDEVAC)
 USMC Bell AH-1 Sea Cobra helicopter
 USMC Sikorsky H-34 helicopter
 USMC Boeing Vertol CH-46 Sea Knight helicopter 
 PBR-105 river patrol boat
 M114 armored fighting vehicle 
 M101 howitzer artillery gun
 M42 Duster mobile anti-aircraft gun
 M35A2 cargo truck
 Dodge M43 ambulance
 Military Police Jeep Willys
 Naval Support Camp

1975 – Present 
Patriots Point has continued to grow; serving as an embarkation point for Fort Sumter tour boats, being home to several other vessels (including the submarine ), the Cold War Submarine Memorial, a replica of a Vietnam Support Base, and the museum of the Medal of Honor Society. Patriots Point celebrated their 10 millionth visitor in February 2017.

On 2 September 2003, Yorktown served as the backdrop for the formal announcement of Senator John Kerry's candidacy as he sought, and ultimately won, the Democratic nomination for President of the United States for the 2004 election.

Patriot's Point also hosts celebrations on patriotic holidays, with military reenactments and weapons demonstrations.

See also
 List of aircraft carriers of the United States Navy

References

External links 
 
 Patriots Point Naval & Maritime Museum
 USS Yorktown Foundation Partner Foundation of Patriots Point
 Congressional Medal of Honor Museum
 USS Yorktown CV10 Association

Museums in Charleston County, South Carolina
Maritime museums in South Carolina
Military and war museums in South Carolina
Naval museums in the United States
Mount Pleasant, South Carolina